The Society of Genealogists (SoG) is a UK-based educational charity, founded in 1911 to "promote, encourage and foster the study, science and knowledge of genealogy". The Society's Library is the largest specialist genealogical library outside North America. Membership is open to any adult who agrees to abide by the Society's rules and who pays the annual subscription. At the end of 2010, it had 11,014 members.

History
Until it purchased 37 Harrington Gardens, South Kensington, in 1954, the Society was based in Malet Place, Bloomsbury, London. The constant growth of the library and increasingly cramped building forced the Society to also sell this headquarters and move both to 14 Charterhouse Buildings (constructed in 1968 for storing rolls of silk), in Clerkenwell, London, in July 1984.

Facilities
The Society possesses the largest family history research library in the United Kingdom, accessible to all members without charge and available to be used by the general public on payment of a fee. Society holdings include thousands of parish register and nonconformist register copies on microfilm or microfiche or in manuscript, typescript or published form, along with tombstone inscriptions, will, marriage licence and census transcripts and indexes, trade and residential directories and poll books (lists of voters), family histories, biographical dictionaries, works on apprentices and occupations, the armed forces, school and university registers and histories, genealogical journals and many other related works. The library catalogue is available on the Society's web site.

In 2000, the Society made a number of its genealogical datasets available online on the commercial service British Origins, with some free access for Society members. This material is now hosted commercially by Findmypast with a separate free service to members run by the Society itself on its own web site using the Frontis Archive Publishing System.

Activities
The emphasis is on British, British Empire and Commonwealth sources, but the Society has some sources for most parts of the world.

The Society's Internet suite offers free access to major genealogical websites including Ancestry and Findmypast.

The society runs a programme of lectures, visits, and courses every year, and publishes textbooks, indexes, and a quarterly journal, Genealogists' Magazine. The latter is currently edited by Michael Gandy.

Prince Michael of Kent Award
The society's patron is Prince Michael of Kent, after whom the Society has named a prestigious award (created in 2000), granted periodically to a person or organisation which has made an outstanding contribution to genealogy.

Recipients

Years not listed means no one was awarded.

References

External links
 
 http://www.diary-of-a-genealogist.co.uk, 'the background, foundation and development of the Society of Genealogists and genealogy in London, 1820-2010', by Anthony J. Camp former Director of the Society.
British Origins

Archives in the London Borough of Islington
Charities based in London
Family history societies in the United Kingdom

Genealogical libraries in the United Kingdom
Genealogical societies
 Society of Genealogists
Organisations based in London with royal patronage
Organisations based in the London Borough of Islington
Organizations established in 1911
1911 establishments in the United Kingdom